In mathematics and classical mechanics, canonical coordinates are sets of coordinates on phase space which can be used to describe a physical system at any given point in time. Canonical coordinates are used in the Hamiltonian formulation of classical mechanics. A closely related concept also appears in quantum mechanics; see the Stone–von Neumann theorem and canonical commutation relations for details.

As Hamiltonian mechanics are generalized by symplectic geometry and canonical transformations are generalized by contact transformations, so the 19th century definition of canonical coordinates in classical mechanics may be generalized to a more abstract 20th century definition of coordinates on the cotangent bundle of a manifold (the mathematical notion of phase space).

Definition in classical mechanics
The canonical coordinates satisfy the fundamental Poisson bracket relations:

Hence in general, the  coordinates are referred to as "conjugate momenta".

Canonical coordinates can be obtained from the generalized coordinates of the Lagrangian formalism by a Legendre transformation, or from another set of canonical coordinates by a canonical transformation.

Definition on cotangent bundles
Canonical coordinates are defined as a special set of coordinates on the cotangent bundle of a manifold.

A common definition of canonical coordinates is any set of coordinates on the cotangent bundle that allow the canonical one-form to be written in the form

up to a total differential. A change of coordinates that preserves this form is a canonical transformation; these are a special case of a symplectomorphism, which are essentially a change of coordinates on a symplectic manifold.

In the following exposition, we assume that the manifolds are real manifolds, so that cotangent vectors acting on tangent vectors produce real numbers.

Formal development
That is, define a function

such that

In local coordinates, the vector field  at point  may be written as

The conjugate momentum then has the expression

The  together with the  together form a coordinate system on the cotangent bundle ; these coordinates are called the canonical coordinates.

Generalized coordinates
In Lagrangian mechanics, a different set of coordinates are used, called the generalized coordinates. When a Hamiltonian is defined  on the cotangent bundle, then the generalized coordinates are related to the canonical coordinates by means of the Hamilton–Jacobi equations.

See also

 Linear discriminant analysis
 Symplectic manifold
 Symplectic vector field
 Symplectomorphism
 Kinetic momentum
 Complementarity (physics)
 Canonical quantization
 Canonical quantum gravity

References

 Ralph Abraham and Jerrold E. Marsden, Foundations of Mechanics, (1978) Benjamin-Cummings, London  See section 3.2.

Differential topology
Symplectic geometry
Hamiltonian mechanics
Lagrangian mechanics
Coordinate systems
Moment (physics)